{{DISPLAYTITLE:C11H8N2S}}
The molecular formula C11H8N2S (molar mass: 200.26 g/mol) may refer to:

 Camalexin (3-thiazole-2-yl-indole)
 MTEP, or 3-((2-Methyl-4-thiazolyl)ethynyl)pyridine

Molecular formulas